Elastic Rock is Nucleus' first album. Recorded in January 1970, it was a pioneering work in the emerging genre of jazz-rock fusion. Bandleader Ian Carr (later a jazz journalist and published expert on Miles Davis) was probably inspired by Davis' "going electric" in 1969, but the seminal Bitches Brew had not yet been released at the time Elastic Rock was recorded, and according to Carr, they hadn't even heard Davis' less rock-influenced 1969 electric release, In a Silent Way.

In July 1970 the group presented compositions from the LP at the Montreux Jazz Festival, winning the first prize. They subsequently performed both at Newport Jazz Festival and at the Village Gate jazz club.

Track listing
All tracks composed by Karl Jenkins; except where indicated
"1916" – 1:11
"Elastic Rock" – 4:05
"Striation" – 2:15 (Jeff Clyne, Chris Spedding)
"Taranaki" – 1:39 (Brian Smith)
"Twisted Track" – 5:17 (Chris Spedding)
"Crude Blues, Part I" – 0:54 (Karl Jenkins, Ian Carr)
"Crude Blues, Part II" – 2:36  (Ian Carr)
"1916: The Battle of Boogaloo" – 3:07
"Torrid Zone" – 8:41
"Stonescape" – 2:39
"Earth Mother" – 5:15 (Karl Jenkins, Ian Carr, John Marshall, Jeff Clyne, Chris Spedding)
"Speaking for Myself, Personally, in My Own Opinion, I Think..." – 0:54 (John Marshall)
"Persephones Jive" – 2:15 (Ian Carr)

Personnel
Nucleus
Karl Jenkins – oboe, baritone saxophone, electric piano, piano
Ian Carr – trumpet, flugelhorn
Brian Smith – tenor saxophone, soprano saxophone, flute
Chris Spedding – acoustic guitar, electric guitar
Jeff Clyne – bass, electric bass
John Marshall – drums, percussion

Notes

External links
Nucleus at All About Jazz
Ian Carr at All About Jazz
Karl Jenkins biography

1970 debut albums
Vertigo Records albums
Repertoire Records albums
Universal Records albums
Nucleus (band) albums
Albums recorded at Trident Studios